Alberich is the dwarf of German and Old Norse mythology

Alberich may also refer to:

People
 Alberic of Monte Cassino (d. 1088), Roman Catholic Cardinal and author
 Alberich of Reims (c. 1085–1141), Roman Catholic archbishop
 Alberich Mazak (1609–1661), Czech-Austrian composer
 Alberich Rabensteiner (1875–1945), Cistercian monk martyred at Heiligenkreuz Abbey, Austria
 Alberich Zwyssig (1808-1854), Cistercian monk who composed what is now the Swiss national anthem

 Maria Pascual Alberich (1933–2011). Spanish illustrator

Places
 Alberich Glacier, Antarctica

Fiction and Literature
 Alberich, character in Der Ring des Nibelungen by Richard Wagner
 Alberich, character in Heralds of Valdemar by Mercedes Lackey
 Alberich, nickname of Silke Haller in the German TV series Tatort Münster.

Military
 Alberich, code name for anechoic tile developed by the Germans for U-Boats in World War II
Operation Alberich, a German military operation in France during World War I
 Operation Alberich, German secret service operation to uncover the 2007 bomb plot in Germany

See also
Alberic
Albrecht (disambiguation)